Dr. Ernst Joseph Walch (born 12 May 1956) has been a member of the Principality of Liechtenstein's government as Minister of Foreign Affairs since April 2001. He studied law in Innsbruck, where he earned his doctorate in 1980, and at the New York University School of Law, Graduate Division, Institute of Comparative Law, where he received his Master of Comparative Jurisprudence in 1981. He was admitted to the Bar in the United States in 1983 and in the Principality of Liechtenstein in 1984.

As a representative of the Progressive Citizens' Party (FBP), he was a member of the Parliament of Liechtenstein from 1989 to 1996. From 1992 to 1993, he acted as FBP party spokesman in the Parliament; in 1993, he was President of the Landtag. From 1983 to 1993, Dr. Walch represented the Progressive Citizens' Party as member of the Steering committee of the European Democrat Union.

Minister Walch belongs to various professional organizations, including the New York State Bar Association, the Liechtenstein Law Society and the German-Austrian-Swiss Registered Association of Lawyers (DACH). He is also a certified interpreter and translator for English and German. Dr. Walch has authored numerous publications on international legal issues, notably international commercial law. He is a partner in the Liechtenstein law firm Walch & Schurti.

References

External links
Walch & Schurti—attorneys at law

Members of the Landtag of Liechtenstein
Speakers of the Landtag of Liechtenstein
1956 births
Living people
Liechtenstein diplomats
Progressive Citizens' Party politicians
Liechtenstein lawyers
New York University School of Law alumni